Paul Edward Lowe (born September 27, 1936) is an American retired professional football player who was a halfback for the Los Angeles/San Diego Chargers and Kansas City Chiefs of the American Football League (AFL) from 1960 to 1969. He won an AFL championship with the Chargers in 1963 and a Super Bowl with the Chiefs in 1969. He played college football for the Oregon State Beavers.

College career
Lowe attended Oregon State University and played under Beavers coach Tommy Prothro. In his sophomore year (1956) he played as a reserve quarterback and running back, compiling 293 yards on 13 for 27 passing behind Joe Francis, and rushing 124 for 427 yards and 6 touchdowns behind Tom Berry. The team won the division, finished 11th nationally, and played in the 1957 Rose Bowl, where they lost for the second time to #3 Iowa. After taking his junior year off, Lowe again returned as two-position backup in his senior year, finishing with 100 yards on 6 of 17 passing, along with 62 rushes for 162 yards and 2 touchdowns (third on the team in all categories).

Professional career
After leaving Oregon State University, Lowe played for the San Francisco 49ers during the 1959 pre-season.  However, Lowe was unable to make the team and was released before the regular season began.  He returned to Los Angeles, California to get a job to support his wife, Sophia Lowe.  He took a job in the mailroom for the Carte Blanche Credit Card Corporation, owned by the Hilton family.

In 1960, Barron Hilton, son of famed hotel magnate Conrad Hilton, was the original owner of the Los Angeles Chargers, a start-up team in the newly formed American Football League.  The Chargers General Manager, Frank Leahy, asked Lowe to come out to the Chargers training camp on the basis of his talents at Oregon State a few years back.  Lowe joined the Chargers as a free agent.  He returned his first touch of the football in the AFL for a 105-yard touchdown in the Chargers' first-ever exhibition game. That season, he led the team in rushing with 855 yards on 136 carries (6.3 yard average) and also had 23 receptions for 377 yards.  In 1961, with the team now based in San Diego, Lowe had the Chargers' longest run from scrimmage with an 87-yard run, a record that still stands. After leaving the Chargers in 1969. Lowe played nine games for Kansas City on special teams, winning a Super Bowl ring  along with fellow AFL 10-year men Tom Flores, Johnny Robinson, Jacky Lee and Coach Hank Stram.

Lowe was the UPI and Sporting News American Football League MVP in 1965 with a league-leading 1,121 yards rushing and 6 touchdowns (14-game schedule).  He was also a three-time all-American Football League selection.  Lowe set a pro football record with six games in which he gained 100 or more yards on 14 or fewer carries.  He has the AFL's all-time highest rushing average, at 4.89 yd/carry (also a Chargers franchise record), and his career rushing total of 4,995 yards is second best all-time in the AFL.  He is also one of only twenty players who were in the AFL for its entire ten-year existence.

Legacy
In 1970, the Pro Football Hall of Fame named Lowe as a halfback on the All-Time All-AFL Team.  In 1979, the Chargers inducted him into the Chargers Hall of Fame.  Lowe remains in San Diego and supports his team as a season ticket holder.

References

 

1936 births
Living people
American football halfbacks
Los Angeles Chargers players
Oregon State Beavers football players
Kansas City Chiefs players
San Diego Chargers players
American Football League All-League players
American Football League All-Star players
American Football League All-Time Team
American Football League Most Valuable Players
American Football League rushing leaders
People from Homer, Louisiana
Players of American football from Louisiana
American Football League players